Guy McElwaine (June 29, 1936 – April 2, 2008) was a former professional baseball player turned Hollywood agent, producer and studio head.

He joined Metro-Goldwyn-Mayer's publicity department in 1955 but left in 1959 to join marketing and public relations agency Rogers & Cowan. In 1964, he set up his own PR firm. He became an agent at Creative Management 
Associates in 1969 and was a founding partner of International Creative Management when CMA merged with International Famous Agency in 1975. He was the first agent of Steven Spielberg.

While at CMA, he became vice-president of worldwide production at Warner Bros. but left after 18 months and rejoined the agency when ICM was created.

He left ICM to join Columbia Pictures in 1981 and became head of production in October 1983 replacing Frank Price and lasted until April 1986.

The first film that started production under his reign at Columbia Studios was The New Kids.  Columbia's production increased during his reign with 14 films started in 1984 compared to 9 in 1983 but none of the 14 were hits when they were released. The biggest hit produced under his tenure was The Karate Kid Part II with a gross of $115 million on a negative cost of $14 million.  He greenlit Ishtar, produced by Warren Beatty for whom McElwaine had acted as publicist for in the past. The budget doubled from an initial $27.5 million to $55 million and he was fired after production wrapped. He was fired by Columbia Pictures and succeeded by David Puttnam.

He rejoined ICM in 1988 and in 2002 became president of Morgan Creek Entertainment until his death from pancreatic cancer.

McElwaine married six times, including to actress Leigh Taylor-Young. He was also involved with Lana Wood, who revealed in her 2021 memoir that she terminated a pregnancy by him in 1963.

References

External links

Obituary at Deadline Hollywood
Obituary at Hollywood Reporter
Obituary at Variety
Obituary at LA Times
Obituary  at USA Today

1936 births
2008 deaths
American film studio executives
Talent agents
Deaths from pancreatic cancer